The Grand Prix of Donetsk was a one-day road cycling race held annually in Ukraine. It was part of UCI Europe Tour in category 1.2.

Winners

References

UCI Europe Tour races
Recurring sporting events established in 2008
Recurring sporting events disestablished in 2013
2008 establishments in Ukraine
2013 disestablishments in Ukraine
Cycle races in Ukraine
Sport in Donetsk
Spring (season) events in Ukraine
Defunct cycling races in Ukraine